Second Fiddle is a 1939 American musical romance film directed by Sidney Lanfield, starring Sonja Henie, Tyrone Power, Rudy Vallée and Lyle Talbot and released by 20th Century Fox. The score was composed by Irving Berlin. The screenplay, based on George Bradshaw's story Heart Interest, involves a Hollywood publicity agent who falls in love with a new actress he helped to discover. The film combines a parody of the extensive search for an actress to play Scarlett O'Hara in Gone with the Wind with a Cyrano de Bergerac–type plot. It is sometimes known as Irving Berlin's Second Fiddle.

Plot 
Jimmy Sutton, the publicity agent of a major Hollywood studio, is taking part in the endless search to find an actress to star in an adaptation of a best-selling novel, Girl of the North. After over 400 actresses have been tested and rejected, he is sent to the small town of Bergen, Minnesota to meet Trudi Hovland, a schoolteacher whose photo and details were unknowingly submitted to the studio. She is very doubtful, but with the entire town backing her, Jimmy persuades her to return to Hollywood with him. After he takes her back to Los Angeles, she tries for and manages to secure the role.

In an effort to boost their popularity, Jimmy organizes a fake romance between Trudi and another Hollywood star, Roger Maxwell. He neglects to tell Trudi that Roger is already romantically involved with another actress and is only interested in publicity.

Problems begin to arise when Trudi, unaware that the romance is fake, falls in love with Roger just as Jimmy begins to realize that he has feelings for Trudi himself. He pours his efforts into writing her poems and songs, purportedly from Roger. When she finally discovers that the romance is a fake she flees back home to Minnesota. She misses the premiere of her film, which proves to be a runaway hit. Jimmy travels out to see her, hoping to secure her forgiveness and tell her about his own feelings. To his horror he discovers she has gone off on a road trip to get married on the rebound to a local she is not really in love with. He hurries after her to prevent the wedding, but seemingly arrives too late.

Cast 

 Sonja Henie – Trudi Hovland
 Tyrone Power – Jimmy Sutton
 Rudy Vallée – Roger Maxwell
 Edna May Oliver – Aunt Phoebe
 Mary Healy – Jean Varick
 Lyle Talbot – Willie Hogger
 Alan Dinehart – George 'Whit' Whitney
 Minna Gombell – Jenny
 Stewart Reburn – Skating Partner
 Spencer Charters – Joe Clayton
 George Chandler – Taxi Driver
 Irving Bacon – First Justice of the Peace
 Maurice Cass – Second Justice of the Peace
 John Hiestand – Announcer
 Charles Lane – Voice of the Studio Chief
 The Brian Sisters – Themselves
 Leyland Hodgson – Henry

References

Bibliography 
 Hemming, Roy. The Melody Lingers On: The Great Songwriters and their Movie Musicals . Newmarket Press, 1999.

External links 

1939 films
1930s English-language films
Films directed by Sidney Lanfield
American romantic musical films
Films about filmmaking
American black-and-white films
Films scored by Irving Berlin
20th Century Fox films
1930s romantic musical films
1930s American films